Ilex asprella, also known as rough-leaved holly and plum-leaved holly, is a deciduous shrub native in South East Asia. Ilex asprella is one of the few deciduous species in the family Aquifoliaceae.

Morphology 

A densely branched deciduous shrub, growing up to 3 m tall. The long shoots glabrous, brown, and slender, while the short shoots green with significant white lenticels. Leaves thin-chartaceous, glandular-punctate on the back, ovate, 4 to 5 cm in length, 1.5 to 2.5 cm broad. Leaf apex acuminate, leaf base cuneate, leaf margin sermlate, hirsute on adaxial nerves and nearly glabrous beneath. Petioles 3 to 8 mm long. Reticulate veins with 6 to 8 pairs of pinnate lateral veins.

White flowers in axillary umbels with slender pedicels, dioecy. Male flower: 2 to 5 flowers each inflorescence, 2.5 to 3 mm in diameter, glabrous; 4 or 5 suborbicular petals, margin erose, corolla rotate, base slightly connate; stamens ca. 3/4 as long as petals, anthers oblong and ca. 1 mm. Female flower: 4 to 6 flowers each inflorescence, glabrous, ca. 3 mm in diameter; flowers 4-6; calyx deeply 4 to 6 lobed; corolla rotate, petals suborbicular, basal slightly connate; staminodes ca. 1 mm, sterile anthers sagittate; ovary ovoid, ca. 1.5 mm in diameter, style present, stigma thickly discoid.

Drupe black and globose, endocarp stony, 5 mm long, 4 mm across, pedicel 2 to 3 cm long.

Distribution 
Adapted to tropic climate and hummus soil. Can be found in low altitude about 400 to 1000 m in Luzon, S. E. China, and Taiwan in the thickest.

Usage 
Used as a traditional Chinese medicine for multiple effects. The root is dug out during winter and dried in daylight. It is either cooked and consumed as soup or smashed and applied on the skin.

References 

asprella